The Central Sofia Cemetery (Tsentralni sofiyski grobishta) or the Orlandovtsi Cemetery ("Орландовци") is the main cemetery in Sofia, the capital of Bulgaria. The cemetery has several chapels used by various Christian denominations, such as a Bulgarian Orthodox church of the Dormition of the Theotokos, a Roman Catholic chapel of Saint Francis of Assisi, an Armenian Apostolic chapel, a Jewish synagogue, etc. The cemetery also features Russian, Serbian, Romanian  and British military sections.

Notable interments
 Georgi Asparuhov, footballer
 Elisaveta Bagryana, Bulgarian writer and poet
 Blaga Dimitrova, Bulgarian poet and 2nd Vice-President of non-Communist Bulgaria
 Georgi Dimitrov, Prime Minister of Bulgaria
 Ghena Dimitrova, soprano
 Dimitar Dimov
 Mykhailo Drahomanov, Ukrainian scholar.
 Nicola Ghiuselev, operatic bass
 Aleko Konstantinov
 Andrey Lyapchev
 Aleksandar Pavlov Malinov, Prime Minister of Bulgaria
 Lyubomir Miletich
 Gyorche Petrov 
 Vanya Petkova, Bulgarian poet, writer and Guinness World Records candidate
 Vasil Radoslavov, Prime Minister of Bulgaria
 Boris Sarafov
 Petko Slaveykov
 Pencho Slaveykov
 Hristo Smirnenski
 Stefan Stambolov
 Petko Staynov
 Dimitar Talev
 Zhelyu Mitev Zhelev, 1st President of non-Communist Bulgaria
 Todor Zhivkov, Communist politician
 Wilfred Burchett Australian journalist

References

External links
 Sofia cemeteries official web site
 

Cemeteries in Bulgaria
Eastern Orthodox cemeteries
Jewish cemeteries
Roman Catholic cemeteries
Buildings and structures in Sofia

Tourist attractions in Sofia